Tarxien Rainbows Football Club are a football team from Tarxien, a town in southern Malta. They currently play in the Maltese Challenge League.

The club were founded as Rainbows Tarxien in April 1934, and participated in all the divisions of Maltese football. They have been in the top flight 3 times, with the longest spell starting from the 2008–2009 season. The club was promoted to the best division after finishing as champions in the Maltese First Division in 2007–08. In 2008–09 the club finished level on points with fellow strugglers Ħamrun Spartans and Msida St. Joseph. Ħamrun had the worst head-to-head record and were relegated, while Tarxien Rainbows managed to avoid relegation with a playoff-win over Msida St. Joseph. In 2009–10 the season was different for the Rainbows as they managed to place fifth in the table and proceeded to the semi-finals of both domestic cup competitions that the club played.

In the 2009–10 season, Tarxien Rainbows placed fifth in the championship pool above rivals Hibernians. The team won the derby three times in a row making it a historical season. Tarxien went on to reach the semi-final of the F.A. Trophy and the 100th Anniversary Cup.

In the 2010–11 season Tarxien Rainbows finished in fifth place in the championship pool. The club ended the First Round in second place. In the same season they reached the Semi-final of the U*BET FA Trophy.

In the 2011–12 season Tarxien Rainbows avoided relegation with a few games remaining before the end of the season.

Players

Current squad

Out on loan

Managers
 Noel Coleiro (2008–2011)
 Patrick Curmi (Oct 11, 2011 – May 16, 2012)
 Danilo Dončić (May 31, 2012 – Aug 27, 2012)
 Clive Mizzi (Aug 27, 2012 – 2014 )
 Jacques Scerri (Aug 2015 – Nov 2016)
 Brian Testaferrata (Nov 2016 – June 2017)
 Jose Borg (July 2017 – July 2019)
 Marko Glumac (July 2019 – November 2019)
 Demis Paul Scerri (December 2019 –2020 )
 Winston Muscat (July 2020 – February 2021)
 Steve D'Amato (February 2021–present)

External links

Media Websites
SoccerWay Club Profile

 
Football clubs in Malta
Association football clubs established in 1934
1934 establishments in Malta